Chassignieu is a commune in the Isère department in southeastern France.

Geography
The Bourbre forms the commune's northwestern border.

Population

See also
Communes of the Isère department

References

Communes of Isère